The following highways are numbered 279:

Canada
Manitoba Provincial Road 279
 Quebec Route 279

Japan
 Japan National Route 279

United States
 Interstate 279
 Alabama State Route 279
 Arizona State Route 279 (former)
 Arkansas Highway 279
 Delaware Route 279
 Florida State Road 279 (former)
 Georgia State Route 279
 Iowa Highway 279 (former)
 K-279 (Kansas highway)
 Kentucky Route 279
 Maryland Route 279
 Montana Secondary Highway 279
 New Mexico State Road 279
 New York State Route 279
 North Carolina Highway 279
 Ohio State Route 279
 Tennessee State Route 279
 Texas State Highway 279
 Texas State Highway Loop 279
 Farm to Market Road 279 (Texas)
 Utah State Route 279
 Vermont Route 279
 Virginia State Route 279
 West Virginia Route 279